István Messzi was a Hungarian weightlifter. He won a Silver medal in the 82.5 kg class at the 1988 Summer Olympics in Seoul.

References 

1961 births
1991 deaths
Olympic weightlifters of Hungary
Weightlifters at the 1988 Summer Olympics
Olympic silver medalists for Hungary
Dynamo sports society athletes
Olympic medalists in weightlifting
Medalists at the 1988 Summer Olympics
Hungarian male weightlifters
20th-century Hungarian people